The Fliegende Panzerfaust, meaning 'Flying Bazooka' (literally 'Flying Armor Fist') in the German language, was a project for a Third Reich very-short-range interceptor designed by Luftschiffbau Zeppelin.

The Fliegende Panzerfaust project was part of the Nazi propaganda-based Wunderwaffe ('wonder weapon') concept. It was proposed to the Emergency Fighter Program against the allied bombing raids over Nazi Germany in the last years of World War II.

Description

The Fliegende Panzerfaust was a rocket-powered design meeting the demand for a low-cost aircraft in a very-short-range interceptor role. It was a parasite aircraft meant to be towed behind a Messerschmitt Bf 109G for which it had a special long, "up-turned" nose for towing. Powered by six Schmidding SG 34 solid-fuel rocket engines, three on each side on the rear half of the fuselage, the Fliegende Panzerfaust was a small aircraft with an armored nose, a v-tail, a wingspan of 4.5 m and a length of 6.0 m.

This Zeppelin-built aircraft would have been released upon reaching combat altitude above the enemy bomber fleet. Shortly before contact with the combat box below it would ignite its engines, attacking the target bomber by firing two 73 mm RZ 65 air-to-air missiles at extremely close range.
 
Since after spending the rocket fuel the center of gravity would shift substantially making the aircraft too difficult to handle, the front half of the Fliegende Panzerfaust, which had the pilot lying in a prone position in the cockpit, would then split from the other half. Both parts would land separately with parachutes, being later retrieved and reused. Owing to the extreme risks for the pilot inherent in its operation this aircraft is sometimes referred to as a suicide weapon.

Specifications

Replicas 

There is a Fliegende Panzerfaust replica on display at the Military Aviation Museum in Virginia Beach, Virginia.

See also

Bibliography
 Manfred Griehl & Joachim Dressel, Die Deutschen Raketenflugzeuge 1935-1945: Die Entwicklung einer umwalzenden Technik, Weltbild,

References

External links 
Fliegende Panzerfaust model

1940s German experimental aircraft
Rocket-powered aircraft
Research and development in Nazi Germany
Abandoned military aircraft projects of Germany
V-tail aircraft